Jewish Americans have played a significant role in jazz, a music genre created and developed by African Americans. As jazz spread, it developed to encompass many different cultures, and the work of Jewish composers in Tin Pan Alley helped shape the many different sounds that jazz came to incorporate.

Background
Jazz music is a multicultural music, created and developed by African Americans using European instruments with Jewish Americans and others mixing in to further diversify the music. Jazz music was invented in the late nineteenth and early twentieth centuries. Originating in New Orleans, the music gained its momentum by getting a start in the red light districts. African Americans playing ragtime in the red light districts were the precursor to what was soon to become jazz. As World War I came to a close jazz started to enter the public arena. Two years later the prohibition of alcohol went into effect. This resulted in the creation of speakeasies, which allowed for jazz music to flourish.

Jewish American contributions
Jewish Americans were able to thrive in jazz because of the probationary whiteness that they were allotted at the time.  George Bornstein wrote that African Americans were sympathetic to the plight of the Jewish American and vice versa. As disenfranchised minorities themselves, Jewish composers of popular music saw themselves as natural allies with African-Americans. This enabled them to make music that was promoted and heard as "black music".

In the 1920s and 1930s, George Gershwin and others deliberately minimized their Jewish identity at a time when Jews were not fully accepted as Americans, instead attempting to create musical version of an inclusive America. They saw their music as an example of an America without prejudice.

In the 1940s and 1950s, Mezz Mezzrow, Symphony Sid, Red Rodney, and Roz Cron experimented with black identity in various ways and to varying degrees in order to "re-minoritize" Jewishness.  Symphony Sid won several awards from black organizations, including an award for Disc Jockey of the Year presented to him in 1949 by the Global News Syndicate, for his "continuous promotion of negro artists".

Louis Armstrong was willing to show his sympathy in an outspoken manner, going as far as being photographed wearing a Star of David necklace. Willie "The Lion" Smith grew up alongside Jewish Americans and later discovering he had a Jewish ancestor of his own, ultimately converting to the religion. The adoption of ideas and music wasn't solely one-directional;  Black musicians also adopted Jewish music.  Willie "The Lion" Smith, Slim Gaillard, Cab Calloway, and other black musicians played Jewish and Jewish themed songs.

In the 1930s, some Jewish musicians actively worked with black musicians at a time when such interactions were taboo.  Benny Goodman, Artie Shaw and others fought for integration.  Concert promoter and record producer Norman Granz and Barney Josephson, who opened the first integrated night club Café Society, broke down barriers of segregation.

The 1927 film The Jazz Singer with Al Jolson is one example of how Jewish Americans were able to bring jazz, music that African Americans developed, and into popular culture. Ted Merwin wrote that the film was seen as a glorification of Jewish assimilation into American culture.

Benny Goodman was a vital Jewish American to the progression of jazz. Goodman was the leader of a racially integrated band named King of Swing. His jazz concert in the Carnegie Hall in 1938 was the first ever to be played there. The concert was described by Bruce Eder as "the single most important jazz or popular music concert in history: jazz's 'coming out' party to the world of 'respectable' music."

Many Jews became successful in the jazz industry through performing or promoting jazz music. This raised accusations of exploitation of black musicians. These accusations were sometimes rooted in stereotypes.

"Jewish jazz" was an attempt to combine Jewish music and jazz into a new genre. It began in the 1930s with "Jewish Swing". It continued in the 1960s with albums by Shelly Manne and Terry Gibbs.  It had a resurgence in the 1990s, with albums by John Zorn, Steven Bernstein, Paul Shapiro, and others. According to Charles Hersch, at its best Jewish jazz both affirmed Jewishness and reveled connections to African American culture.

Notable figures 

 Willie "The Lion" Smith
 Teddy Charles
 Irving Berlin
 Ziggy Elman
 George Gershwin and Ira Gershwin
 Benny Goodman
 Joe Glasser
 Herbie Mann
 Stan Getz
 Lee Konitz
 Al Jolson
 Buddy Rich
 Artie Shaw
 John Zorn
 Kurt Weill

References 

History of jazz